Juegos de lectura en voz alta is an Argentine teacher's book by Luis Pescetti. It was first published in 1999.

Books by Luis Pescetti
1999 books